Kasempa District is a district of Zambia, located in North-Western Province. The capital lies at Kasempa. As of the 2000 Zambian Census, the district had a population of 44,002 people.

References

Districts of North-Western Province, Zambia